Baby, Baby may refer to:

Music
 "Baby Baby" (Amy Grant song)
 "Baby Baby" (Corona song)
 "Baby, Baby" (Nicole & Hugo song)
 "Baby, Baby" (Bear in the Big Blue House song)
 "Baby Baby" (Ratcat song)
 "Baby Baby" (The Vibrators song)
 "Baby, Baby (I Know You're a Lady)", a song by David Houston
 "Baby Baby" a song by Girls' Generation
 "Baby, Baby", a song by Eighth Wonder
 "Baby, Baby, a song by Xtreme "
 "Baby, Baby", a song by take

Others
 Baby Baby (doll), a DeFilippo doll produced by Ideal Toy Company

See also 
 Baby Baby Baby (disambiguation)
 Baby (disambiguation)